So B. It is a 2016 American drama film directed by Stephen Gyllenhaal and written by Garry Williams, based on the 2004 novel of same name by Sarah Weeks. The film stars Talitha Bateman, Jessie Collins, Alfre Woodard, John Heard, Jacinda Barrett, Dash Mihok, and Cloris Leachman. It was released in April 2017 by Good Deed Entertainment.

Plot 
Heidi DeMuth (Talitha Bateman) is a twelve-year-old girl with a mentally disabled mother, but who is otherwise extremely lucky. She is taken care of by her agoraphobic next-door neighbor, Bernadette, at whose door the two appeared when Heidi was about a week old. Before stumbling upon an old disposable camera, Heidi has no information of her family or origin other than that her mother's 23-word vocabulary includes the word "soof," which she assumes holds some meaning she longs to uncover. She travels alone by bus from Reno, Nevada to Liberty, New York to visit the group home in the photographs and probe its tight-lipped manager for answers. She is assisted by strangers she meets on the way, and all the while she ponders the nature of truth, whether it is always knowable, and whether it is always worth knowing.

Cast 

 Talitha Bateman as Heidi DeMuth
 Jessie Collins as Sophia Lynne DeMuth
 Alfre Woodard as Bernadette
 John Heard as Thurman Hil
 Jacinda Barrett as Ruby Franklin
 Dash Mihok as Roy Franklin
 Cloris Leachman as Alice Wilinsky
 Mataeo Mingo as Zander
 Luis Moncada as Zander's Dad

Production 
Principal photography on the film began on July 13, 2015 in Los Angeles.

References

External links 
 
 

2016 films
Films shot in Los Angeles
Films set in Nevada
Films set in Reno, Nevada
Films about children
Films based on children's books
Films based on American novels
American children's drama films
2016 drama films
Films directed by Stephen Gyllenhaal
2010s English-language films
2010s American films